Roberto Heinze Hauser (born July 22, 1946) is a Mexican sprint canoer who competed from the late 1960s. He was eliminated in the repechages of the K-4 1000 m event at the 1968 Summer Olympics in Mexico City.

References
Sports-reference.com profile

1946 births
Canoeists at the 1968 Summer Olympics
Living people
Mexican male canoeists
Sportspeople from Mexico City
Olympic canoeists of Mexico
Mexican people of German descent